Indonesia competed at the 2012 Summer Olympics in London, United Kingdom from July 27 to August 12, 2012. This was the nation's fourteenth appearance at the Olympics, having not competed at the 1964 Summer Olympics in Tokyo and the 1980 Summer Olympics in Moscow because of the United States boycott.

The National Sports Committee of Indonesia (KONI) sent the nation's smallest delegation to the Games since 1984. A total of 22 athletes, 13 men and 9 women, competed in 8 sports. Three athletes received their spots in athletics and swimming by wild card entries. Other Indonesian athletes won their spots by participating in various qualifying matches around the world. Badminton player and former Olympic gold medalist Taufik Hidayat, who competed at his fourth Olympic games, was the oldest and most experienced athlete of the team. Backstroke swimmer I Gede Siman Sudartawa, the youngest male athlete of the team, was Indonesia's flag bearer at the opening ceremony.

Indonesia, however, failed to win an Olympic gold medal for the first time since 1992, leaving London with only a silver and a bronze medal. Weightlifters Eko Yuli Irawan and Triyatno managed to repeat their Olympic medals from Beijing.

Indonesia also left the Olympic Games with a controversy, surrounding the athletes' sporting performance. Badminton doubles pair Meiliana Jauhari and Greysia Polii were among the eight athletes who disqualified from the tournament, after being found guilty of "not using best efforts" and "conducting oneself in a manner that is clearly abusive or detrimental to the sport" by playing to lose matches in order to manipulate the draw for the knockout stage.

Originally, Indonesia won two medals: one silver and one bronze in weightlifting. 53 kg-weightlifter Citra Febrianti originally finished fourth, but was promoted to second after gold medallist Zulfiya Chinshanlo and bronze medallist Cristina Iovu were both disqualified., gaining herself a silver medal.

Medalists

| width="78%" align="left" valign="top"|  

| width="22%" align="left" valign="top"|

| width="22%" align="left" valign="top"|

| width="22%" align="left" valign="top" |

Competitors 
The following is the list of number of competitors participating in the Games:

Archery

Athletics

Men

Women

Badminton

Men

Women

Mixed

Fencing

Indonesia has qualified 1 fencer.

Women

Judo

Indonesia has qualified 1 judoka

Shooting

Indonesia have qualified the following shooters.

Women

Swimming

Indonesian swimmers have so far achieved qualifying standards in the following events (up to a maximum of 2 swimmers in each event at the Olympic Qualifying Time (OQT), and 1 at the Olympic Selection Time (OST)):

Men

Weightlifting

Indonesia has qualified 5 men and 1 woman.

Men

Women

See also
 2012 Olympic Games
 2012 Paralympic Games
 Indonesia at the Olympics
 Indonesia at the Paralympics
 Indonesia at the 2012 Summer Paralympics

References

Nations at the 2012 Summer Olympics
2012
Summer Olympics